Lanius, the typical shrikes, are a genus of passerine birds in the shrike family Laniidae.  The majority of the family's species are placed in this genus. The genus name, Lanius, is derived from the Latin word for "butcher", and some shrikes are also known as "butcher birds" because of their feeding habits. The common English name "shrike" is from Old English scríc, "shriek", referring to the shrill call.

African species are known as fiscals. That name comes from the Afrikaans word fiskaal ("public official", especially a hangman), because they hang their prey on thorns for storage.

Most Lanius species occur in Eurasia and Africa, but the great grey shrike has a circumpolar distribution, and the loggerhead shrike is confined to  North America. There are no members of this genus or the shrike family in South America or Australia.

Lanius shrikes are birds of open habitats typically seen perched upright on a prominent perch like a treetop or a telephone pole. They sally out for prey, taken in flight or the ground. These species primarily take large insects, but will also take small birds, reptiles and mammals. For large northern species such as the great grey, the majority of the prey will be vertebrates, especially in winter.

Despite their diet, these are not true birds of prey, and lack the strong talons of the raptors. Though they use their feet to hold smaller insects, larger prey items are impaled upon a sharp point, such as a thorn or the barbs of barbed wire. Thus secured they can be ripped open with the hooked bill.

Most Lanius shrikes are solitary, except when breeding and are highly territorial. Northern or temperate species such as the great grey and red-backed shrikes are migratory and winter well south of the breeding range.

The sexes of most species are distinguishable, the male invariably being the brighter bird where there is a difference.

There are some natural groupings within the genus, such as the seven African fiscals, the large grey species (ludovicianus, excubitor, meridionalis and sphenocercus) and the Eurasian brown-backed species (tigrinus, bucephalus, collurio, isabellinus, cristatus and gubernator). In the last group in particular, it has been difficult to define species’ boundaries, and in the past several of these shrikes have been lumped as conspecific.

The prehistoric shrike Lanius miocaenus has been described from Early Miocene fossils found at Langy, France.

Taxonomy and species list
The genus Lanius was introduced by the Swedish naturalist Carl Linnaeus in 1758 in the tenth edition of his Systema Naturae. The type species was designated as the great grey shrike by the English naturalist William John Swainson in 1824. The genus name is a Latin word meaning "butcher".

The genus contains the following 30 species:

Former species
Formerly, some authorities also considered the following species (or subspecies) as species within the genus Lanius:
 Southern grey shrike (as Lanius meridionalis)
 Crested shriketit (as Lanius frontatus)
 Rufous whistler (as Lanius macularius)
 Northern variable pitohui (as Lanius kirhocephalus)
 Red-whiskered bulbul (as Lanius jocosus)
 Grey-cheeked bulbul (as Lanius Bres)

References

 
Bird genera
Shrikes